Fletcherella niphadothysana is a moth of the family Pterophoridae. It is known from Irian Jaya, Java and Sumbawa in Indonesia and Leyte in the Philippines.

References

Platyptiliini
Moths described in 1952
Taxa named by Alexey Diakonoff
Moths of Indonesia
Moths of the Philippines